A Song by Lantern Light is a 1943 Japanese historical drama film by Mikio Naruse. It is based on a novel by Kyōka Izumi.

Plot
Japan in the Meiji era: Kitahachi, son of famous noh actor Genzaburo Onchi, is disowned by his father after Kitahachi's humiliation of noh singer Sozan results in Sozan's suicide. Also, Genzaburo forbids Kitahachi ever to perform again. When Kitahachi, who now earns his money as a street musician, learns that Sozan's daughter Osode tries to find work as a geisha but struggles with her inability to play an instrument, he teaches her the art of noh dancing. During his stay in Kuwana, Genzaburo is impressed by Osode's dancing skills and, upon hearing that she was instructed by Kitahachi, reunites with his son.

Cast
 Shōtarō Hanayagi as Kitahachi Onchi
 Isuzu Yamada as Osode
 Ichijirō Ōya as Genzaburo Onchi
 Masaro Muata as Sozan
 Eijirō Yanagi as Jirozo

Background
A Song Lantern starred Shōtarō Hanayagi, a popular shinpa and film actor, who had previously appeared in the lead role in Kenji Mizoguchi's The Story of the Last Chrysanthemums (1939), which too portrayed a stage actor during the Meiji period.

According to Naruse biographer Catherine Russell, the director was faced with interferences by the Home Ministry during the film's production, and while she calls the submissive character of Osode "not well developed", she points out the elegance of some of the film's sequences.

In his 2005 review for Slant Magazine, Keith Uhlich titled The Song Lantern an "intoxicating work" and "visual marvel", comparable to the works of Mizoguchi.

References

External links
 

1943 films
1943 drama films
Japanese drama films
Japanese black-and-white films
Films based on Japanese novels
Films directed by Mikio Naruse
Films set in the Meiji period
Toho films
1940s Japanese-language films